Y+L amino acid transporter 2, also known as cationic amino acid transporter, y+ system, is a protein that in humans is encoded by the SLC7A6 gene.

See also 
 Heterodimeric amino acid transporter

References

Further reading 

 
 
 
 
 

Solute carrier family